Klein Curaçao (English: Little Curaçao) is a  uninhabited island belonging to, and lying 10 km south-east of, Curaçao, a constituent country of the Kingdom of the Netherlands in the Dutch Caribbean.

Description
Klein Curaçao has a  desert climate (in the Köppen climate classification BWh and BWk), a climate in which there is an excess of evaporation over precipitation. The only structures on the island are an old lighthouse, a beach house, and several huts. Klein Curaçao is well known as a beautiful diving spot because of its coral and underwater caves. The island has no permanent inhabitants, only a few palm-frond-covered sheds for day trippers from Curaçao, and apart from some coconut palms has little vegetation. There are some fishermen's huts where fishermen normally stay for some days. They get water from the Coast Guard of Curaçao. The windward side is a graveyard for boats that did not stay out far enough or lost power. A small tanker, the Maria Bianca Guidesman, is gradually being demolished by the constant pounding of the waves since 1988. The remains of another four or five boats have been washed far onshore. As with Curaçao, hurricanes are few, but several storms have left their mark; the 1877 hurricane destroyed the first lighthouse. The next lighthouse, which still survives, was built in the interior of the island.

History
The island played a part in the slave trade. The Dutch West India Company brought many slaves from Africa to Curaçao. Before these slaves came ashore in Curaçao, the sick were placed in quarantine at Klein Curaçao. The remains of this first quarantine building can still be found in the northwest of the island. The slaves, and other passengers who did not survive the voyage, were buried at Klein Curaçao. There are several graves in the southern part of the island. The Dutch West India Company were also given licenses to hunt the now extinct Caribbean monk seals on Klein Curaçao. In 1871, John Godden, an English mining engineer, visited the island, discovering there was a significant vein of phosphate on the island. From 1871 onward until 1886, the Dutch government set up mining operations on the island, with phosphate being mined and exported to Europe.

Environment
Once the phosphate was mined out, the level of the island dropped, and seabird populations plummeted. Goats were once allowed to roam the island, which contributed to its desertification. The goats were eradicated in 1996, as were feral cats by 2004. Reforestation is being undertaken by CARMABI Marine Research Station, Curaçao. The island was designated as a protected Ramsar site in 2018. It has also been identified as an Important Bird Area by BirdLife International as a nesting site for least terns, while its shores are used seasonally by large numbers of migratory waders. With the elimination of the goats and cats, the island has the potential to become an important seabird nesting location. Hawksbill, loggerhead and green sea turtles nest on the island's beaches.

Gallery

See also

 List of lighthouses in Curaçao

References

Landforms of Curaçao
Islands of the Netherlands Antilles
Uninhabited islands of the Netherlands
Lighthouses in Curaçao
Ramsar sites in the Netherlands
Important Bird Areas of the Dutch Caribbean
Seabird colonies
Island restoration